Jack Faxon (June 9, 1936 – January 9, 2020) was an American politician and educator from the U.S. state of Michigan.

Background
Faxon was born in Detroit, Michigan and graduated from Central High School in Detroit. He received his bachelor's and master's degree from Wayne State University in education. Faxon also received his master's degree in history from University of Michigan. He taught in Detroit and Farmington Hills, Michigan and served as headmaster of a school mainly for exchange students.

Political career
Faxon served in the Michigan Constitutional Convention of 1961 and 1962, He also served in the Michigan House of Representatives from the 15th district from 1965 to 1971 and in the Michigan Senate from 1971 to 1995. Faxon was a Democrat.

Death
Faxon died due to complications with lymphoma on January 9, 2020, in Oak Park, Michigan at age 83.

References

1936 births
2020 deaths
Educators from Michigan
Politicians from Detroit
Wayne State University alumni
University of Michigan alumni
Democratic Party members of the Michigan House of Representatives
Democratic Party Michigan state senators
Deaths from cancer in Michigan
Deaths from lymphoma
20th-century American politicians